Arathi Sara Sunil (born 1 October 1994) is an Indian badminton player. She participated at the 2018 Asian Games.

Achievements

BWF International Challenge/Series (6 titles, 2 runners-up) 
Women's doubles

  BWF International Challenge tournament
  BWF International Series tournament
  BWF Future Series tournament

References

External links
 

Living people
1994 births
Sportspeople from Kochi
Racket sportspeople from Kerala
Sportswomen from Kerala
Indian female badminton players
Badminton players at the 2018 Asian Games
Asian Games competitors for India
20th-century Indian women
21st-century Indian women